Xyriel Anne Bustamante Manabat (born January 27, 2004) is a Filipino child actress. She is most commonly known for playing roles of child characters in teleseryes.

Personal life
Manabat was born on January 27, 2004, to Daryl Jake Manabat and Elizabeth Dianne Bustamante-Manabat. She also has a brother named Xandrei Ezekiel. Manabat is also a member of the Filipino religious Christian church Iglesia ni Cristo.

In late June 2020, Ms. Manabat graduated from Golden Faith Academy with high honors.

Career
Manabat began acting in 2009 after joining Star Circle Quest: Search for the Next Kiddie Idol, where she place 3rd Runner-Up in the talent competition. She appeared in several television programs after that, but her breakthrough role was playing the young Agua and Bendita in the eponymous series. She later received the title role in the teleserye, Momay. After Momay concluded, she appeared in the series Noah. In 2011, she starred alongside Coney Reyes as the demanding Anna Manalastas in 100 Days To Heaven. On December 26, 2010, Manabat won Best Child Actress of the 36th Metro Manila Film Festival for her role in the comedy film, Ang Tanging Ina Mo (Last na 'To!). In 2014, she stars in Hawak Kamay with Zaijian Jaranilla, Andrea Brillantes and Piolo Pascual. Later returned from acting as an antagonist from Dirty Linen with Francine Diaz and Seth Fedelin.

Filmography

Television

Movies

Awards and nominations

References

External links
 

Living people
2004 births
ABS-CBN personalities
Star Magic
Filipino child actresses
Filipino television actresses
Filipino film actresses
Star Circle Quest participants
Actresses from Rizal
Star Magic personalities